Kuboraum (German:  "cubic room") is a brand of Italian-made sunglasses and eyeglasses. Kuboraum was founded in Berlin in 2012 by Italian designer Livio Graziottin, and anthropologist Sergio Eusebi. The brand refers to its eyewear as "masks".

History
The founders first met in Berlin in 2009 during a vernissage in an art gallery of a mutual friend.

The Kuboraum project started in February 2012. It applied the Italian artisanal tradition in a Berlin-based creative environment. Hence the company's slogan, "dreamed in Berlin, handmade in Italy".

The brand was founded in the rooms of a former post office on the border between east and west Berlin. The space that was originally converted into a gallery, immediately which became the incubator for the creation of new projects. After various metamorphoses, today this place includes the studio, showroom and the Kuboraum flagship store, from design to brand identity, from images to communication, from photo to video productions, from installations to interior design projects

Positioning 
Kuboraum was conceived in opposition to the dominant eyewear aesthetic, as an affirmation of independence from an industrial logic based on market research, trends and the abandonment of individual expression.

They introduced the reinterpretation of an object of use—eyewear—through the codes, values, and power of a mask.

Kuboraum considers aesthetic, cultural, and conceptual principles in search of an ecstatic relationship with people who become part of the community. Kuboraum does not sell its glasses or masks, but shares them with their community, because the sale of these glasses is the medium the Kuboraum project uses to tell this story.

References

Retail companies established in 2012
Luxury brands